Frances O'Connor (September 8, 1914 – January 30, 1982) was an American entertainer. Born without arms, she made her living appearing in circus sideshows billed as the armless wonder or the living Venus de Milo. She would perform normal actions such as eating, drinking, writing and smoking a cigarette, using her feet. She also did knitting and sewing with her feet as a hobby. She worked firstly with AI G Circus and then from the mid-1920s to the mid-1940s with Ringling Brothers and Barnum and Bailey travelling circuses.

O'Connor appeared in the 1932 pre-code cult film classic Freaks, opposite Martha Morris (1902-1937), (who was also born without arms, and shortened legs), directed and produced by Tod Browning. The film revolves around a group of individuals with physical deformities, predominantly played by real life freak show performers. In the film she would demonstrate how she used her feet to perform everyday activities, with an almost ballerina style grace.

Personal life 
Her mother served as her showbiz manager. Frances O'Connor never married and never had children. After having retired from the travelling circuit, she died in relative obscurity in Long Beach, California, at the age of 67 in 1982.

References

1914 births
1982 deaths
People without hands
Sideshow performers
20th-century American actresses